Cross-origin resource sharing (CORS) is a mechanism that allows restricted resources on a web page to be requested from another domain outside the domain from which the first resource was served.

A web page may freely embed cross-origin images, stylesheets, scripts, iframes, and videos. Certain "cross-domain" requests, notably Ajax requests, are forbidden by default by the same-origin security policy. CORS defines a way in which a browser and server can interact to determine whether it is safe to allow the cross-origin request. It allows for more freedom and functionality than purely same-origin requests, but is more secure than simply allowing all cross-origin requests.

The specification for CORS is included as part of the WHATWG's Fetch Living Standard. This specification describes how CORS is currently implemented in browsers. An earlier specification was published as a W3C Recommendation.

Technical overview 

For Ajax and HTTP request methods that can modify data (usually HTTP methods other than GET, or for POST usage with certain MIME types), the specification mandates that browsers "preflight" the request, soliciting supported methods from the server with an HTTP OPTIONS request method, and then, upon "approval" from the server, sending the actual request with the actual HTTP request method. Servers can also notify clients whether "credentials" (including Cookies and HTTP Authentication data) should be sent with requests.

Simple example 

Suppose a user visits http://www.example.com and the page attempts a cross-origin request to fetch the user's data from http://service.example.com.  A CORS-compatible browser will attempt to make a cross-origin request to service.example.com as follows.

 The browser sends the GET request with an extra Origin HTTP header to service.example.com containing the domain that served the parent page:<nowiki>Origin: http://www.example.com</nowiki>
 The server at service.example.com sends one of these three responses:
 The requested data along with an Access-Control-Allow-Origin (ACAO) header in its response indicating the requests from the origin are allowed. For example in this case it should be: <nowiki>Access-Control-Allow-Origin: http://www.example.com</nowiki>
 The requested data along with an Access-Control-Allow-Origin (ACAO) header with a wildcard indicating that the requests from all domains are allowed: Access-Control-Allow-Origin: *
 An error page if the server does not allow a cross-origin request

A wildcard same-origin policy is appropriate when a page or API response is considered completely public content and it is intended to be accessible to everyone, including any code on any site. A freely available web font on a public hosting service like Google Fonts is an example.

A wildcard same-origin policy is also widely and appropriately used in the object-capability model, where pages have unguessable URLs and are meant to be accessible to anyone who knows the secret.

The value of "*" is special in that it does not allow requests to supply credentials, meaning that it does not allow HTTP authentication, client-side SSL certificates, or cookies to be sent in the cross-domain request.

Note that in the CORS architecture, the Access-Control-Allow-Origin header is being set by the external web service (service.example.com), not the original web application server (www.example.com). Here, service.example.com uses CORS to permit the browser to authorize www.example.com to make requests to service.example.com.

If a site specifies the header "Access-Control-Allow-Credentials:true", third-party sites may be able to carry out privileged actions and retrieve sensitive information. Even if it does not, attackers may be able to bypass any IP-based access controls by proxying through users' browsers.

Preflight example 

When performing certain types of cross-domain Ajax requests, modern browsers that support CORS will initiate an extra "preflight" request to determine whether they have permission to perform the action. Cross-origin requests are preflighted this way because they may have implications to user data.

OPTIONS /
Host: service.example.com
Origin: http://www.example.com
Access-Control-Request-Method: PUT

If service.example.com is willing to accept the action, it may respond with the following headers:

Access-Control-Allow-Origin: http://www.example.com
Access-Control-Allow-Methods: PUT

The browser will then make the actual request. If service.example.com does not accept cross-site requests from this origin then it will respond with error to the OPTIONS request and the browser will not make the actual request.

Headers 

The HTTP headers that relate to CORS are:

Request headers 

Origin
Access-Control-Request-Method
Access-Control-Request-Headers

Response headers 

Access-Control-Allow-Origin
Access-Control-Allow-Credentials
Access-Control-Expose-Headers
Access-Control-Max-Age
Access-Control-Allow-Methods
Access-Control-Allow-Headers

Browser support

CORS is supported by all browsers based on the following layout engines:
 Blink- and Chromium-based browsers (Chrome 28+, Opera 15+, Amazon Silk, Android's 4.4+ WebView and Qt's WebEngine)
 Gecko 1.9.1 (Firefox 3.5, SeaMonkey 2.0) and above.
 MSHTML/Trident 6.0 (Internet Explorer 10) has native support. MSHTML/Trident 4.0 & 5.0 (Internet Explorer 8 & 9) provide partial support via the XDomainRequest object.
 Presto-based browsers (Opera) implement CORS as of Opera 12.00 and Opera Mobile 12, but not Opera Mini.
 WebKit (Initial revision uncertain, Safari 4 and above, Google Chrome 3 and above, possibly earlier).
 Microsoft Edge All versions.

History
Cross-origin support was originally proposed by Matt Oshry, Brad Porter, and Michael Bodell of Tellme Networks in March 2004 for inclusion in VoiceXML 2.1 to allow safe cross-origin data requests by VoiceXML browsers.  The mechanism was deemed general in nature and not specific to VoiceXML and was subsequently separated into an implementation NOTE.  The WebApps Working Group of the W3C with participation from the major browser vendors began to formalize the NOTE into a W3C Working Draft on track toward formal W3C Recommendation status.

In May 2006 the first W3C Working Draft was submitted. In March 2009 the draft was renamed to "Cross-Origin Resource Sharing" and in January 2014 it was accepted as a W3C Recommendation.

CORS vs JSONP
CORS can be used as a modern alternative to the JSONP pattern. The benefits of CORS are:

 While JSONP supports only the GET request method, CORS also supports other types of HTTP requests. 
 CORS enables a web programmer to use regular XMLHttpRequest, which supports better error handling than JSONP. 
 While JSONP can cause cross-site scripting (XSS) issues when the external site is compromised, CORS allows websites to manually parse responses to increase security.

The main advantage of JSONP was its ability to work on legacy browsers which predate CORS support (Opera Mini and Internet Explorer 9 and earlier). CORS is now supported by most modern web browsers.

See also 
 Content Security Policy
 Cross-document messaging

References

External links
 Fetch Living Standard (the current specification for CORS)
 MDN HTTP access control (CORS) article
 Setting CORS on Apache with correct response headers allowing everything through
 Detailed how-to information for enabling CORS support in various (web) servers
 HTML5 Rocks explains how CORS works in detail
 W3C CORS for Developers guide
 How to disable CORS on WebKit-based browsers for maximum security and privacy
 Online CORS misconfiguration scanner 

Ajax (programming)
World Wide Web Consortium standards